Piparsand is a village in Sarojaninagar block of Lucknow district, Uttar Pradesh, India. As of 2011, its population was 4,336, in 769 households. It has three schools providing primary education, a post office, and a public library. It is the seat of a gram panchayat.

Piparsand's village lands cover an area of 1,298.6 hectares, of which 897.9 (69%) is farmland as of 2011. As of the same year, areas used for non-agricultural purposes cover 166 hectares, which is 13% of the total land area. There is also a forest cover of 144.3 hectares.

References 

Villages in Lucknow district